The Mutuals’ Deferred Shares Act 2015 is an Act of the Parliament of the United Kingdom. It received royal assent on the 26 March.

See also
 Co-operatives and Community Benefit Societies Act 2003

References

United Kingdom Acts of Parliament 2015
2015 in economics
Tax legislation in the United Kingdom